Capellanía is a corregimiento in Natá District, Coclé Province, Panama. Its population as of 1990 was 3,817; its population as of 2000 was 4,396.

References

Corregimientos of Coclé Province